The 1973–74 season was Paris Saint-Germain's 4th season in existence. PSG mainly played their home league games at the Stade Municipal Georges Lefèvre in Saint-Germain-en-Laye, but occasionally in Paris as well, at the Parc des Princes and the Stade Jean-Bouin, registering an average attendance of 4,087 spectators per match. The club was presided by Henri Patrelle and the team was coached by Robert Vicot. Jean-Pierre Dogliani was the team captain.

Summary

Paris Saint-Germain really took flight with the arrival of fashion designer Daniel Hechter as chairman of the management committee in June 1973. Besides offering his financial support to the club, he also designed the team's classic home outfit. Hechter then shocked the national game ahead of 1973–74; he appointed French legend Just Fontaine as sporting director and signed several prestigious players, including Jean-Pierre Dogliani, Jean Deloffre, Louis Cardiet and Jacky Bade.

Robert Vicot's men finished second in Group B, four points behind Red Star, qualifying for the promotion play–offs against Valenciennes. The winner of this double-legged match would be promoted to Division 1. PSG lost 1–2 away to Valenciennes, but PSG recorded an incredible 4–2 comeback at the Parc des Princes, thus achieving promotion and regaining its professional status abandoned two years earlier. Overwhelmed by emotion, Fontaine collapsed on the lawn, victim of a heart attack. Fortunately, he recovered and was carried by the players in celebration. Since then, PSG have always played in the top flight of French football.

PSG played their first game at the Parc des Princes during this campaign. It was against fellow Parisian side Red Star on November 10, 1973. PSG won 3–1 and Othniel Dossevi scored the club's first goal at the stadium. The Parisians also began their tradition of brilliant Coupe de France runs, reaching the quarterfinals after beating Metz at the Parc in front of 25,000 spectators (2–1; 4–1 on agreggate). There, they were ousted by Reims on a 2–7 aggregate that included the club's largest cup defeat ever (0–5).

Players

As of the 1973–74 season.

Squad

Transfers

As of the 1973–74 season.

Arrivals

Departures

Kits

Canadian soft-drink brand Canada Dry was the shirt sponsor. French sportswear brand Le Coq Sportif was the kit manufacturer.

Competitions

Overview

Division 2

League table (Group B)

Results by round

Matches

Coupe de France

Preliminary rounds

Round of 64

Round of 32

Round of 16

Quarter-finals

Statistics

As of the 1973–74 season.

Appearances and goals

|-
!colspan="16" style="background:#dcdcdc; text-align:center"|Goalkeepers

|-
!colspan="16" style="background:#dcdcdc; text-align:center"|Defenders

|-
!colspan="16" style="background:#dcdcdc; text-align:center"|Midfielders

|-
!colspan="16" style="background:#dcdcdc; text-align:center"|Forwards

|-

References

External links

Official websites
PSG.FR - Site officiel du Paris Saint-Germain
Paris Saint-Germain - Ligue 1 
Paris Saint-Germain - UEFA.com

Paris Saint-Germain F.C. seasons
Association football clubs 1973–74 season
French football clubs 1973–74 season